Henning Kvitnes (born 13 May 1958) is a singer/songwriter from Tistedal, Halden in Norway. His debut came with The Ice Cream Band, but he later found bigger success as a solo artist.

Biography
Kvitnes first made a name for himself in 1978, with The Ice Cream Band, who warmed up for Elvis Costello at Chateau Neuf in Oslo. The band soon changed name to The Young Lords. As a member of The Young Lords he released his first album, Same Shit - New Wrapping in 1980. In 1991 he released his first album in Norwegian, titled Veien hjem.

Kvitnes has during his career collaborated with several of Norway's most famous musicians, Åge Aleksandersen, Arve Tellefsen, Steinar Albrigtsen and Claudia Scott, to mention a few.

In 2007 he won a Norwegian Grammy, Spellemannsprisen, for his album Stemmer i gresset. He has also won Norsk artistsforbunds ærespris, an annual honorary title given out to stand out musicians.

Discography
1980 - Same Shit - New Wrapping (with The Young Lords)
1981 - We Like to Watch (with Saturday Cowboys)
1982 - Little Big Horn - Live (with Saturday Cowboys)
1982 - The Tunnel (with Henning Kvitnes Next Step)
1984 - Open Roads (with Next Step)
1987 - Back to Little Eden (with Henning Kvitnes Little Eden)
1988 - Solitude Road (with Little Eden)
1989 - Everyday Life (with Little Eden)
1991 - Veien hjem
1991 - Songs people play (Greatest hits album)
1993 - Postcards from life
1995 - Godt Vann
1996 - Tida bare kommer (de beste)
1998 - Evig eies (kun et dårlig rykte)
1999 - Heartland
2001 - Scandicana
2003 - På godt norsk
2004 - Bare vente litt på sjelen
2005 - Manda' morra - 14 sanger av Stein Ove Berg
2006 - Ut av veggen
2007 - Stemmer i gresset
2009 - Tid for latskap
2010 - For sånne som oss - de beste
2010 - Bortkomne julestjerner med Koret på Botsen
2012 - Ingen tid å miste
2014 - Jada, vi elsker...

References

External links
 Official homepage
 Henning Kvitnes on MySpace

1958 births
Living people
Norwegian musicians
Spellemannprisen winners
Musicians from Halden